Felipe Jesus Manuel Campos Mosqueira (born 8 November 1993), known as Felipe Campos, is a Chilean footballer that currently plays for Everton as right-back.

International career
Campos was named in Chile's provisional squad for Copa América Centenario but was cut from the final squad.

Notes

References

External links
 
 

1993 births
Living people
Chilean footballers
Chilean expatriate footballers
2013 South American Youth Championship players
South American Youth Championship players
Chile under-20 international footballers
Association football defenders
Club Deportivo Palestino footballers
Colo-Colo footballers
Atlético Tucumán footballers
Everton de Viña del Mar footballers
Chilean Primera División players
Argentine Primera División players
Chilean expatriate sportspeople in Argentina
Expatriate footballers in Argentina